Hadi Shehu (1949–2017) was a Kosovar stage and film actor.

Early life

Hadi began his career in theater of Gjakova, as an amateur. He was the founder of Professional Theatre in Gjakova, where he also worked as director until 2007. A Graduate of the School of Pedagogy in Prishtina 1974, he studied in Dramatic Art at the school of Faruk Begolli. He has realized hundreds of memorable roles in drama.

Death

Died in Gjakove, on March 12, 2017.

Acting

Shehu performed in The Perfume Shop in its original Albanian language at the Edinburgh Festival Fringe in 2002.

Personal life

He was born in Gjakova, in old Albanian family.

Filmography
 Monserati
 When the Soul dies
 The man with the ball
 Age before the Court

References

External links

 

1949 births
2017 deaths
Kosovan male actors
Yugoslav male film actors
Yugoslav male stage actors
Yugoslav Albanians